Lourmel Airfield is an abandoned military airfield in Algeria, located in the El Amria area.

During World War II it was a civil airport seized by the United States Army during the Operation Torch landings in November 1942.  After its capture from the Vichy French, it was used by the United States Army Air Force Twelfth Air Force 61st Troop Carrier Group during the North African Campaign.

The 61st flew C-47 Skytrain transports from the airfield from 15 May-21 June 1943.

References

 Maurer, Maurer. Air Force Combat Units of World War II. Maxwell AFB, Alabama: Office of Air Force History, 1983. .

External links

Airfields of the United States Army Air Forces in Algeria
Airports established in 1942
1942 establishments in Algeria